JQT may refer to:

JQT (band), a Korean girl group
jQT (software), a JavaScript library